Eric Arthur Simms, DFC (24 August 1921 – 1 March 2009) was an English ornithologist, naturalist, writer, sound recordist, broadcaster and conservationist, as well as a decorated wartime Bomber Command pilot/ bomb-aimer.

He was born on 24 August 1921, the youngest of three brothers, in London, where his father was head gardener at the private gardens in Ladbroke Square.

He won a scholarship to Latymer Upper School and in 1939 began to read history at Merton College, Oxford, where he also took up bird ringing and joined the University Air Squadron, and, without completing his studies, was sent for aircrew training in Canada and the United States in 1941. He was called up, joining the Royal Air Force in 1941 and by 1943 was a Leading Aircraftman, and was then commissioned as a pilot officer on probation in the Royal Air Force Volunteer Reserve on 19 March 1943, serving as a bomb aimer and second pilot in Lancaster bombers, in which he flew 27 raids over Germany. On 14 November 1944 he was awarded Distinguished Flying Cross, the citation praising his "skill and determination which have been an inspiration to the crews with which he flies" and a "complete disregard for danger in the face of the heaviest enemy defences".

After demobilisation, he worked as a teacher in Warwickshire, and served on the research committee of the West Midland Bird Club.

He then worked for the BBC, initially as a wildlife sound recordist, before making more than 7,000 radio broadcasts and hundreds of television appearances. He was a passionate believer in bringing natural history to a wider audience, and was a resident naturalist at the BBC. He is credited with starting the Countryside radio programme in 1952. As a guest on Desert Island Discs in 1976, one of his eight choices was a recording of a blackbird he had made near his London home. He narrated the 1972 BBC LP "A Year's Journey" (catalogue number RED135M), which was subtitled "Wildlife recordings from the BBC TV Series for schools".

Simms also appeared in Sir John Betjeman's 1973 TV documentary Metro-land, about the Metropolitan Railway line running northwest out of London. He was featured birdwatching in Gladstone Park, near to his home in Dollis Hill.

In 1980 he and his wife Thelma (who was Section Officer Thelma Jackson, WAAF, when they married) retired to South Witham, near Grantham, Lincolnshire. He died on 1 March 2009. Thelma had died in 2001. They had a daughter and a son, Amanda and David, and four granddaughters.

Bibliography 
Simms was a prolific writer of over twenty books and numerous articles.

 
 
  (With Myles North)
  (New Naturalist series no.52)
 
 
 
 
  (New Naturalist series no.63)
 
 
 
 
 
  (New Naturalist series no.71)
 
  (New Naturalist series no.78)

References 

1921 births
2009 deaths
Alumni of Merton College, Oxford
British nature writers
English ornithologists
People educated at Latymer Upper School
Recipients of the Distinguished Flying Cross (United Kingdom)
Royal Air Force Volunteer Reserve personnel of World War II
Wildlife sound recordists
New Naturalist writers
20th-century British zoologists
Royal Air Force officers